Livadicko lake ( or ; , Štrbačko jezero or Ливадичко језеро, Livadičko jezero) is a mountain lake in the Shar Mountains in Kosovo.

It is next to the Tumba Peak (Šar) and Maja Livadh peaks.

References 

Lakes of Kosovo
Šar Mountains